"Just a Little Talk with Jesus" is a gospel music song published by Stamps-Baxter Music Company on January 1, 1937, written by Cleavant Derricks. In 1936, he sold the song to Stamps-Baxter in exchange for fifty songbooks, which he then sold for ten cents each.

It has been recorded by many notable artists, including The Fairfield Four., Elvis Presley, The Stanley Brothers, Nina Hagen and others. In 2005, Keith Lancaster arranged the song as "It's All Right."

Here are 21 additional renditions reported by Hymnary.org.

References

1937 songs
Elvis Presley songs
Gospel songs
Songs about Jesus